Ólafur Gústavsson (born 27 March 1989) is an Icelandic handball player for KA Akureyri and the Icelandic national team.

He competed at the 2013 World Men's Handball Championship.

References

1989 births
Living people
People from Horsens
Olafur Gustafsson
Expatriate handball players
KIF Kolding players
Aalborg Håndbold players
Olafur Gustafsson
SG Flensburg-Handewitt players
Knattspyrnufélag Akureyrar handball players